Väinö Aleksander Hupli (8 June 1886 in Viipurin maalaiskunta – 27 August 1934 in Marienbad, Czechoslovakia) was a Finnish journalist and politician. He was a Member of the Parliament of Finland for the Social Democratic Party of Finland from 1919 to 1922. He was Minister of Trade and Industry from 1926 to 1927 in the cabinet of Väinö Tanner.

References

1886 births
1934 deaths
People from Vyborg District
People from Viipuri Province (Grand Duchy of Finland)
Social Democratic Party of Finland politicians
Ministers of Trade and Industry of Finland
Members of the Parliament of Finland (1919–22)